Mark Gold is an English animal rights and veganism activist and writer. He has worked for Compassion in World Farming and Animal Aid, organised vegan events and is the author of four books on animal issues, a novel and two books on Wolverhampton Wanderers F. C.

Life and career 
Mark Gold was born in Birmingham and studied English at York University.

Gold worked for Compassion in World Farming from 1978 to 1983, before becoming National Organiser. He was Director of Animal Aid for 12 years. In 1992, he directed the short film Their Future in Your Hands for Animal Aid. In 2017, Gold organised Animal Aid's three-week Vegan Festival of Britain. In 2021, he organised Exeter Vegan Market. He continues to work for Animal Aid and also works for Citizens Advice.

Gold has authored four books on animal issues: Assault and Battery: What Factory Farming Means for Humans and Animals (1983), Living Without Cruelty: Choose a Cruelty Free Lifestyle (1988), Animal Rights: Expanding the Circle of Compassion (1995) and Animal Century: A Celebration of Changing Attitudes to Animals (1998). The Observer voted Living Without Cruelty as one of the top green books of the period. In 2008, he published his first novel Cranks and Revolutions, which won praise from the British politician Tony Benn. He has published two books on Wolverhampton Wanderers F. C.: Under a Wanderers Star: Forty Pain Filled Years Following the Wolves (2002) and The Boys from the Black Country (2010).

Publications

Articles 

 "If Slaughterhouses Had Glass Walls", Animals: A New Ethics, No. 271, March–April 2012

Books 

 Assault and Battery: What Factory Farming Means for Humans and Animals (Pluto Press, 1983)
 Living Without Cruelty: Choose a Cruelty Free Lifestyle (Green Publishing, 1988)
 Animal Rights: Expanding the Circle of Compassion (John Carpenter Publishing, 1995)
 Animal Century: A Celebration of Changing Attitudes to Animals (John Carpenter Publishing, 1998)
 Under a Wanderers Star: Forty Pain Filled Years Following the Wolves (Offwell Press, 2002)
 Cranks and Revolutions (Merlin Press, 2008)
 The Boys from the Black Country (SportsBooks, 2010)

Chapters

Reports 

 "The Global Benefits of Eating Less Meat: A Report for Compassion in World Farming Trust" (Compassion in World Farming, 2004)

References 

Living people
Year of birth missing (living people)
20th-century English male writers
21st-century English male writers
British animal rights activists
British veganism activists
People from Birmingham, West Midlands
York University alumni